Russian History, formerly named History of the USSR (1957–1992) and National History (1992–2008), is a journal of the Institute of History of the Russian Academy of Sciences (RAS). It is indexed in Web of Science and Scopus.

References 

Publications established in 1957
European history journals
Historiography of the Soviet Union
Bimonthly journals
History of Russia (1991–present)
Russian Academy of Sciences academic journals